"Number 12 Looks Just Like You" is an episode of the American television anthology series The Twilight Zone. It is set in a dystopian future in which everyone, upon reaching adulthood, has their body surgically altered into one of a set of physically attractive models.

Opening narration

Plot
In a future society, all nineteen-year-olds go through a process known as "the Transformation", in which each person's body is changed to a physically attractive design chosen from a selection of numbered models. The process also slows deterioration due to age and confers immunity to disease, extending human lifespans, as well as making unspecified psychological corrections. Due to the overwhelming popularity of female model 12 and male model 17, all adults wear name badges to avoid confusion.

Eighteen-year-old Marilyn Cuberle decides not to undergo the Transformation. Nobody else can understand Marilyn's decision, and her family and best friend are all confused by her displeasure with the conformity and shallowness of contemporary life. Her "radical" beliefs were fostered by her now-deceased father, who gave Marilyn banned books and came to regret his own Transformation years earlier, committing suicide upon the loss of his identity.  Her mother takes her to see Dr. Rex, who initially thinks Marilyn wants to have the procedure early, but is shocked to find about Marilyn's refusal.

Dr. Rex sends her to Professor Sigmund Friend, who claims that the Transformation is justified as it has led to the end of war and hate in society, along with many health benefits, in addition to the change in appearance.  When Marilyn protests that she still does not want the procedure, he has Marilyn confined to a hospital room against her will, ostensibly to psychologically examine her and cure her of her reason for refusing the procedure. Marilyn suspects that despite not being legally required, the Transformation is not optional, and is being maintained by the leaders of society to ensure conformity. Her best friend Valerie, who has already undergone the Transformation, shows no emotional reaction to Marilyn's protests, even when she is driven to tears. Marilyn realizes that no one who has undergone the Transformation remains capable of any empathy for or understanding of her. She tries to escape from the hospital, but ends up in the operating room to undergo the Transformation.

Dr. Rex, who operated on Marilyn, comments that some people have problems with the idea of the Transformation but that "improvements" to the procedure now guarantee a positive result. Marilyn reappears, looking and thinking exactly like Valerie. "And the nicest part of all, Val", she gushes, "I look just like you!"

Closing narration

Program notes
To show this future society in this episode, Suzy Parker and Pam Austin play almost all of the female roles (actress Collin Wilcox plays protagonist Marilyn prior to her transformation), while Richard Long plays all of the male roles; dialogue in the episode indicates that Parker and Long portray the most popular models selected for the Transformation. According to show producer William Froug, Parker was specifically cast because she "was at the time the most famous model in the [United States] ... it was my notion that if you were going to do a show about everybody looking as beautiful as possible to use her."

This episode was originally sponsored by American Tobacco (Pall Mall), with an "alternate sponsors" message (from Procter & Gamble) in the middle.

Cultural influence
This episode highlights Hollywood's age-obsession and youthful looks for women, as well as themes of conformity and individuality. Although Collin Wilcox (b. 1935) and Suzy Parker (b. 1932) had only a three-year age difference, Wilcox played the daughter of Parker's character. Wilcox was aged 29 playing an 18-year-old.

The 2005 novel Uglies shares several themes with this episode. It also takes place in a future where teens receive an operation to look 'perfect' and live healthier and longer and centers on a girl who initially refuses the operation.

The band The Number Twelve Looks Like You took their name from the title of this episode.

Charlie Brooker stated in an interview that this episode influenced "Fifteen Million Merits", an episode of his anthology series, Black Mirror.

Dr. Evil from the Austin Powers franchise used the same pinky gestures as Richard Long from this episode.

See also
List of The Twilight Zone (1959 TV series) episodes

References

External links

Text of Charles Beaumont's original story "The Beautiful People"
The Russian translation of this story by Svetlana Vasilyeva

1964 American television episodes
The Twilight Zone (1959 TV series season 5) episodes
Television episodes about plastic surgery
Television shows written by Charles Beaumont
Fiction set in 2000
Fiction set in 2001
Ugliness
Television episodes directed by Abner Biberman